Maralgöl is a mountainous lake at an elevation of  on Mount Murovdag in western Azerbaijan. Maralgol is connected with the Göygöl lake, via the Aghsu River. The collapse of rocks caused by a severe earthquake in 1139 resulted in the formation of this lake, which impeded the path of the local river. The lake is surrounded with the marshland, typical moorland, mountains and dense forests. Out of the eight nearby alpine lakes, it is regarded as one of the most beautiful and attractive in the country.

References

External links 
 In fact, Maralgol is up some 250 steps from the car park. There is a small beach and the water is crystal clear.

Lakes of Azerbaijan